Giuseppe Galluzzi (10 November 1903 – 6 December 1973) was an Italian footballer and manager from Florence. He was a prominent figure in the Florentine football scene, appearing for CS Firenze and then ACF Fiorentina after the merger took place.

He also went into football management, firstly as a player-manager at Fiorentina. Later, he became the first manager of Sampdoria in 1946 after the club was founded by a merger.

He died in Florence on 6 December 1973.

References

External links

1903 births
1973 deaths
Footballers from Florence
Italian footballers
Serie A players
Serie B players
A.C. Legnano players
ACF Fiorentina players
Genoa C.F.C. players
Italian football managers
ACF Fiorentina managers
U.C. Sampdoria managers
Bologna F.C. 1909 managers
Association football midfielders